Charles Denby may refer to
 Charles Harvey Denby (1830–1904), U.S. Civil War officer, diplomat in China
 Charles Denby, Jr. (1861–1938), U.S. diplomat, scholar of Chinese culture